Rivière-Ojima is an unorganized territory in the Abitibi-Témiscamingue region of Quebec, Canada. It consists of two non-contiguous areas in the Abitibi-Ouest Regional County Municipality, separated by the municipality of Authier-Nord. The communities of Languedoc and Saint-Eugène-de-Chazel are located within its boundaries.

Founded in 1949, Languedoc is the youngest rural population centre of the Abitibi and named after a region in southern France. The Parish of Saint-Etienne-de-Languedoc was formed in 1952.

Demographics

Population

Language

See also
Ojima River

References

Unorganized territories in Abitibi-Témiscamingue